Tilbury is a town in Thurrock, Essex, England

Tilbury can also refer to:

Places
 Tilbury, town in Thurrock, Essex, England
 Port of Tilbury, port at Tilbury
 East Tilbury, a village parish in Thurrock, Essex, England
 West Tilbury, a village in Thurrock, Essex, England
 Tilbury Fort, a fort on the north bank of the River Thames to defend London 
 Tilbury, Ontario, Canada, a town
 Tilbury Industrial Park, a business area in the city of Delta, British Columbia, Canada

People
Dawn Tilbury, American control theorist
Gervase of Tilbury, (fl.late 12th century), English lawyer and writer
John Tilbury, (born 1936), British pianist
Peter Tilbury, (born 1945), British actor and writer
Zeffie Tilbury, (1863-1950), English actress
Tilbury Jack, a nickname of John Arundell (admiral) (1495–1561), British Royal Navy admiral

Music
Tilbury (band), Icelandic indie pop folk band
The Tilbury Band, English brass band

Sports
Tilbury F.C., an Association Football club based in Essex

Others
HMS Tilbury, various Royal Navy ships
Tilbury (carriage), a horse-drawn carriage
George Alexander Pyke, Lord Tilbury, a recurring fictional character in the stories of British writer P. G. Wodehouse
Tilbury Town, a fictional town in Edwin Arlington Robinson's poems

See also
 Tilbury Juxta Clare, a parish in north Essex, England